Project Primary Edu is a charity fundraiser that is working to improve Sarkari Primary School in Mor Karima, Ludhiana, Punjab, India.

Sarkari Primary School
Sarkari Primary School is the government school for children ages four to ten who live in village Mor Karima. Only 10% of the children who enroll at Sarkari continue to pursue an education beyond tenth grade level.

Needs of Sarkari Primary School
Like many government funded schools in India, Sarkari lacks many basic necessities. Sarkari does not have desks, chairs, school supplies, or a source of clean water for the students.

Goals of the Fundraiser and Means of Fundraising
Project Primary Edu seeks to generate $5,000 so as to purchase basic school supplies for the students of Sarkari. Beat and Boom, LLC is the vessel for Project Primary Edu. Beat and Boom has published a mobile phone application for iPhone and Android, also called Beat and Boom; 100% of the proceeds from sales of the apps are given to the project.

Notes

Charity fundraisers